Qarasu is a river in Golestan Province of Iran which flows to the Caspian Sea.

References

Rivers of Golestan Province
Landforms of Golestan Province